The Petah Tikva Segula railway station is a suburban passenger railway station in Israel, operated by Israel Railways.

It is located on the Yarkon Railway in northeast Petah Tikva at the Yarkonim shopping district across the Segula industrial zone and is separated from the rest of the city.
The station was opened in 2000 as part of the Tel Aviv - Rosh ha'ayin line. Initially a temporary structure was used and only a single platform was active, until late 2002 when the final structure was finished and both platforms became active.

The station's location is problematic, as it is contained within a commercial center that was constructed without the proper permits (although the station itself was legally built). As a result, after a series of failed legal appeals the center was closed in 2019, complicating the access to and parking at the station.

Train service

Ridership

References

Railway stations in Central District (Israel)
Railway stations opened in 2000
2000 establishments in Israel
Buildings and structures in Petah Tikva